Theisen is a surname. Notable people with the surname include:

Brianne Theisen (born 1988), Canadian heptathlete and women's pentathlete
Joseph M. Theisen (1877–1946), American politician
Paul Theisen (born 1922), Danish fencer
Roger Theisen (born 1932), Luxembourgian fencer
William Theisen, American restaurant entrepreneur

See also
Theisen's, American retail company